David Lorne Steen (born 2 January 1942) is a Canadian former track and field athlete who specialised in the shot put. He was a two-time gold medallist in the event at the Commonwealth Games in 1966 and 1970, breaking games records both times. He had won the bronze medal at the 1962 event.

He was a nine-time national champion in throwing events at the Canadian Track and Field Championships. Also among his honours were a shot put bronze at the 1967 Pan American Games and two bronze medals in the shot and discus at the 1969 Pacific Conference Games. He was coached by Bill Bowerman within the Oregon Ducks track and field program and was part of the winning team for the 1962 American collegiate NCAA title.

Career

Early life
A native of Burnaby, British Columbia,  he became interested in athletics through the exploits of his older brother Don Steen, who became the national decathlon champion in 1955. - Oct 20, 1966 His brother later named his son David Steen, who continued the family's athletic tradition.

He had his first achievements in the shot put while at Douglas Road Elementary School in Burnaby, winning the school title at age eleven. At Burnaby South Secondary School he established himself as one of Canada's best young throwers by setting a national age-group record in the shot put. Steen grew to be a tall man, at six-foot and four and a half inches, and as his physique developed he reached a weight of 235 pounds. He went on to study at the University of Oregon, where he became part of the Oregon Ducks track and field led by coach Bill Bowerman. A central team member in the throw events, Steen placed fifth at the NCAA Men's Division I Outdoor Track and Field Championships in 1962 and competed in the preliminaries of the discus throw. His contribution helped Oregon to the NCAA team title. The following year he had his best placing in NCAA competition, coming second in the shot put final.

International career
Steen won his first national title as a teenager in 1960, winning the hammer throw, which was not very developed at a national level at that point. His first national title in the shot put came at the Canadian Track and Field Championships in 1962. This earned him his first major international call-up for the 1962 British Empire and Commonwealth Games, held in Perth, Western Australia.

For a few weeks in 1963 Steen's top throw was ranked first in the world; he finished the year seventh globally. He was among Canada's top prospects for the 1964 Summer Olympics, but in 1963 he criticized the attitude of officials at the Canadian Amateur Athletic Union, saying that they were not sufficiently concerned with the well-being of the nation's athletes. Suffering heavily from infectious mononucleosis, he ultimately missed the entire 1964 season, including the Olympic competition.

This mark ranked him eleventh in the world that season and went unbettered nationally until Bruce Pirnie's 1972 win. The 1966 British Empire and Commonwealth Games in Kingston, Jamaica saw Steen became Canada's first ever shot put gold medallist at the competition. In addition to the shot put, he competed in the discus event and placed fourth.

He came close to that seasonal peak at the 1967 Pan American Games, which were held on home turf in Winnipeg, Manitoba, Canada. He was the bronze medallist behind two Americans who were world leaders at that point: Randy Matson, who was Olympic champion the year after, and Neal Steinhauer, the top ranked putter in 1969. Steen's 1967 medal was Canada's first in the Pan American men's shot put (his compatriot Nancy McCredie won the women shot that year).

Steen was Canadian champion in the shot put in both 1968 and 1969, solidifying an unbeaten run from 1965. The latter title was his last at national level. His teammate George Puce was the discus winner at the event in Tokyo.

He returned to defend his shot put title at the 1970 British Commonwealth Games. He was the first man to defend that title since Harry Hart did so in 1934. This was the last major competition of his career. He was inducted into the Canadian Olympic Hall of Fame in 1977.

Writing and coaching
After his retirement from competition he began coaching young athletes in the 1970s. This included novelist Lawrence Hill—a keen teenage runner—whom Steen advised to focus on writing after a poor outcome of a fitness test. His athletes also included three Olympians - John Craig, Paul Craig, and Brian Maxwell. Maxwell went on to be the co-inventor of Power Bars. Steen himself wrote several books, including the Canadian Pilot's Fitness Manual in 1979 before moving into youth sport with Aerobic fun for kids in 1982 and Exercise is fun a decade later. He was a writer/editor for the Toronto Star from 1968 to 1994.  David was married on Feb 25, 1967 in Toronto to Cassie Gairdner, a former Eastern Canadian junior champion discus thrower, (introduced to him by his then teammate, Cassie’s brother, William Gairdner, Olympic decathlete).They had 3 children: Laura Jane, Heather and Stefan.  In 1996 David moved back to British Columbia to live by the ocean, write and become one of Canada’s top senior cyclists. In 2022 he published his first novel A Bicycle Story, a mystery and romantic tale that draws on his deep interest in philosophy and sports psychology and politics.

International competitions

National titles
Canadian Track and Field Championships
Shot put: 1962, 1965, 1966, 1967, 1968, 1969
Discus throw: 1965, 1967
Hammer throw: 1960

References

Living people
1942 births
Sportspeople from Burnaby
Canadian male shot putters
Canadian male discus throwers
Oregon Ducks men's track and field athletes
Commonwealth Games medallists in athletics
Commonwealth Games gold medallists for Canada
Athletes (track and field) at the 1962 British Empire and Commonwealth Games
Athletes (track and field) at the 1966 British Empire and Commonwealth Games
Athletes (track and field) at the 1970 British Commonwealth Games
Pan American Games medalists in athletics (track and field)
Athletes (track and field) at the 1967 Pan American Games
Canadian newspaper journalists
Canadian male journalists
Canadian sports journalists
Toronto Star people
Canadian exercise and fitness writers
Pan American Games bronze medalists for Canada
Medalists at the 1967 Pan American Games
Medallists at the 1962 British Empire and Commonwealth Games
Medallists at the 1966 British Empire and Commonwealth Games
Medallists at the 1970 British Commonwealth Games